Greenehaven is an unincorporated community and census-designated place (CDP) in Coconino County, Arizona, United States. It is bordered to the east, west, and south by the city of Page and to the north by the state of Utah. It was first listed as a CDP prior to the 2020 census.

It is within the Fredonia-Moccasin Unified School District.

Demographics

References 

Census-designated places in Coconino County, Arizona